Maurice Bernard Gran (born 26 October 1949, in London, England) is an English writer and one half of scriptwriting duo Marks and Gran. He co-wrote the sitcoms The New Statesman, Birds of a Feather and Goodnight Sweetheart with Laurence Marks. Their theatre works include Dreamboats and Petticoats, Save The Last Dance For Me and Dreamboats and Miniskirts.

Biography
Gran lived in Finsbury Park Road as a child and his father was the manager of a fabric shop in Soho. He attended William Ellis School, a grammar school for boys in Highgate. He then rose to be the manager of the Job Centre in Tottenham, whilst writing scripts with Laurence Marks which they submitted to the BBC.

The duo had begun writing together after they met at a discussion group for writers that was held within the British Drama League. They were given the opportunity to write a radio show for Frankie Howerd after a chance meeting with Barry Took. Gran is also the co-author of Prudence at Number 10, a fictional diary supposedly written by Gordon Brown's P.A.

Writing credits

Awards and nominations

References

External links

Official Marks & Gran website:  https://www.marksandgran.com

1949 births
Living people
English comedy writers
English television writers
People educated at William Ellis School